The Padma class is a class of patrol vessels of the Bangladesh Navy. The ships were constructed at the Khulna Shipyard, through a development program overseen and supported by the CSIC.

History
Under a long-term modernization plan for its armed forces, the Government of Bangladesh decided to order arms from internal contractors. The first step taken was to order warships for the Bangladesh Navy from Khulna Shipyard. Khulna Shipyard signed the construction contract with the Bangladesh Navy on 2 May 2010 and Prime Minister Sheikh Hasina inaugurated the construction on 5 March 2011. The first warship of this class,  was launched on 8 October 2012 and commissioned into the Bangladesh Navy on 24 January 2013. The second patrol craft in the class, was launched on 23 January 2013 and commissioned into the Bangladesh Navy on 29 August 2013. These three ships were commissioned on 23 December 2013.

On 20 May 2019, Directorate General of Defense Purchase (DGDP) ordered further five units of the ships of this class for the Bangladesh Navy. Keel laying of the ships were done on 2 December 2019.

Design
The launch of the indigenous warship paved the way for the Bangladesh Navy to soon deploy its own design. Built at the Khulna Shipyard, the design is an offshore patrol vessel that displaces 350 tonnes. The ships can carry out missions lasting up to seven days at a time.

Armament
The first batch of ships are equipped with a pair of dual 37 mm naval guns and another pair of 20 mm anti-aircraft guns. Second batch of the ships carry one Bofors 40 mm L/60 cannon and a pair of 12.7mm CIS 50MGs.  All these ships can lay mines and can carry MANPADs.

Ships in the class

See also
 List of active ships of the Bangladesh Navy
 List of ships of the Bangladesh Coast Guard

References

Patrol vessels of the Bangladesh Navy
Patrol boat classes